Steve or Steven West may refer to:

 Steve West (Canadian politician) (born 1943), former Alberta MLA
 Steve West (Kentucky politician), member of the Kentucky Senate
 Steve West (ice hockey) (born 1952), former ice hockey player
 Steve West (Danger Danger) (born 1964), drummer of the band Danger Danger
 Steve West (musician) (born 1966), drummer for the band Pavement and frontman of the band Marble Valley
 Steve West (darts player) (born 1975), English darts player
 Steve West (university administrator) (born 1961), Vice Chancellor of the University of the West of England
 Steven L. West, American research scientist and rehabilitation counselor

See also 
Stephen West (disambiguation)